The Hungarian Reformed Church in Allen Park, Michigan, is the only remaining Hungarian Reformed congregation near Detroit, Michigan out of the former four.

History 
Detroit had at least seven churches to serve the new Hungarian immigrants in the 1890s when they flowed into this metropolis. Now, there is one lone church in the vanished Hungarian section of Detroit called Del Ray on South Street.

Doctrine 
 Heidelberg Catechism
 Second Helvetic Confession

Affiliations 
The congregation is a member of the Reformed Church in Hungary, the Calvin Synod (United Church of Christ), and the Hungarian Reformed Church in America.

References

External links 
 Official church website
 Facebook page

Christian organizations established in 1904
Hungarian Reformed organizations in North America
Hungarian-American culture in Michigan
Churches in Wayne County, Michigan
1904 establishments in Michigan